Michael B. Sporn (born February 13, 1933) is a professor emeritus of pharmacology, toxicology and medicine at Dartmouth Medical School. His research focuses on the prevention of cancer.

He graduated from Harvard University in 1952 received his MD at the University of Rochester in 1959.

Sporn was Chief of the Laboratory of Chemoprevention at the National Cancer Institute from 1978 to 1995 where he was an officer of the United States Public Health Service. In 1995, he joined the faculty at Dartmouth.

His recent research has focused on the use of triterpenoids in breast cancer prevention.

His work has been funded by the NIH and Breast Cancer Research Foundation. He is listed as an author on over 500 research papers.

Awards 
 1982 Lila Gruber Award for Cancer Research, American Academy of Dermatology
 1991 AACR-Bruce F. Cain Memorial Award
 1994 Mider Lecture Award, National Institutes of Health
 1994 Medal of Honor, American Cancer Society
 1995-2005 Editor-in-Chief, Cytokine and Growth Factor Reviews
1996 ASCO - American Cancer Society Award and Lecture
 1998 Elected Fellow, American Association for the Advancement of Science
 1998 Bristol-Myers Squibb Award for Distinguished Achievement in Cancer Research
 2002 AACR-Cancer Research Foundation of America Award for Excellence in Cancer Prevention Research
 2004 National Cancer Institute Eminent Scholar
 2005 Brinker Award, Susan G. Komen Breast Cancer Foundation
 2013 Elected Fellow of the AACR Academy

References

American oncologists
1933 births
University of Rochester alumni
Fellows of the AACR Academy
Harvard University alumni
Living people